Escambia County is the westernmost and oldest county in the U.S. state of Florida. It is in the state's northwestern corner. At the 2020 census, the population was 321,905. Its county seat and largest city is Pensacola. Escambia County is included within the Pensacola-Ferry Pass-Brent, Florida, Metropolitan Statistical Area. The county population has continued to increase as the suburbs of Pensacola have developed.

History

The area had been inhabited for thousands of years by indigenous peoples of varying cultures. Historic American Indian tribes at the time of European-American settlement were the Pensacola and Muscogee, known among the English as the Creek.

Escambia County had been part of Spanish colonial settlement before  the United States acquired it in 1818. The county was organized by European-Americans on July 21, 1821; it was named for the Escambia River. The name "Escambia" may have been derived from the Creek name Shambia, meaning "clear water", or the Choctaw word for "cane-brake" or "reed-brake". The Choctaw were another major tribe in the Southeast.

Created on the same date, Escambia and St. Johns Counties were Florida's two original counties, covering the entire territory within modern state boundaries. The Suwannee River was the border between them, following a winding path from the northern border of the state to the Gulf of Mexico. Essentially, the Escambia county government had jurisdiction over the "panhandle" and "big bend" areas, and St. Johns over the remainder of the entire state.

As population increased in the frontier territory, 21 counties were later organized from Escambia county directly or indirectly. They include Jackson (1821), Gadsden (created from Jackson)(1823), Leon (1824), Walton (1824), Washington (created from Jackson and Walton)(1825), Hamilton (1827), Jefferson (1827), Madison (created from Jefferson) (1827), Franklin (1832), Calhoun (1838), Santa Rosa (1842), Wakulla (created from Leon) (1843), Holmes (created from Jackson and Walton) (1848), Liberty (created from Gadsden) (1855), Lafayette and Taylor (created from Madison) (1856), Bay (created from Washington) (1913), Okaloosa (created from Santa Rosa and Walton) (1915), Dixie (created from Lafayette) (1921), and Gulf (created from Calhoun) (1925). The number of counties in Florida since 1925 has been stable at 67.

Geography

The county jurisdiction includes the island of Santa Rosa south of Pensacola; it is not part of Santa Rosa County proper. Escambia County is part of the Pensacola-Ferry Pass-Brent Metropolitan Statistical Area.

Adjacent counties
 Escambia County, Alabama — north
 Santa Rosa County, Florida — east
 Baldwin County, Alabama — west

Escambia County, Florida, and Escambia County, Alabama, are two of 22 counties or parishes in the United States with the same name to border each other across state lines.

National protected areas
 Gulf Islands National Seashore (part)

Demographics

As of the 2020 United States census, there were 321,905 people, 122,169 households, and 74,083 families residing in the county.

2010 Census
At the 2010 census there were 297,619 people, 116,238 households, and 74,040 families living in the county. There were 136,703 housing units at an average density of 206 per square mile (80/km2). The racial makeup of the county was 68.9% White, 22.9% Black or African American, 0.9% Native American, 2.7% Asian, 0.1% Pacific Islander, 1.3% from other races, and 3.2% from two or more races. 4.7% of the population were Hispanic or Latino of any race.
Of the 116,238 households 25.5% had children under the age of 18 living with them, 42.5% were married couples living together, 4.8% had a male householder with no wife present, 16.3% had a female householder with no husband present, and 36.3% were non-families. 28.9% of households were one person and 10.2% were one person aged 65 or older. The average household size was 2.41 and the average family size was 2.96.

The age distribution was 21.6% under the age of 18, 13.0% from 18 to 24, 24.2% from 25 to 44, 26.8% from 45 to 64, and 14.4% 65 or older. The median age was 35 years. For every 100 females, there were 98.60 males. For every 100 females age 18 and over, there were 97.10 males.

The median household income was $43,707 and the median family income was $54,543. Males had a median income of $38,878 versus $30,868 for females. The per capita income for the county was $23,773. About 12.7% of families and 16.9% of the population were below the poverty line, including 26.4% of those under age 18 and 9.2% of those age 65 or over.

2000 Census
At the 2000 census there were 294,410 people, 111,049 households, and 74,180 families living in the county. There were 124,647 housing units at an average density of 188 per square mile (73/km2). The racial makeup of the county was 72.4% White, 21.4% Black or African American, 0.9% Native American, 2.2% Asian, 0.1% Pacific Islander, 0.9% from other races, and 2.2% from two or more races. 2.7% of the population were Hispanic or Latino of any race.
Of the 111,049 households 29.9% had children under the age of 18 living with them, 47.8% were married couples living together, 15.1% had a female householder with no husband present, and 33.2% were non-families. 26.9% of households were one person and 9.7% were one person aged 65 or older. The average household size was 2.45 and the average family size was 2.98.

The age distribution was 23.5% under the age of 18, 12.2% from 18 to 24, 29.0% from 25 to 44, 22.0% from 45 to 64, and 13.3% 65 or older. The median age was 35 years. For every 100 females, there were 98.60 males. For every 100 females age 18 and over, there were 97.10 males.

The median household income was $35,234 and the median family income was $41,708. Males had a median income of $31,054 versus $22,023 for females. The per capita income for the county was $18,641. About 12.1% of families and 15.4% of the population were below the poverty line, including 23.7% of those under age 18 and 9.6% of those age 65 or over.

Politics

Voter registration
According to the secretary of state's office, Republicans constitute a plurality of registered voters in Escambia County.

Statewide elections
Escambia County is very conservative politically, like the rest of the Western Panhandle. Before 1994, the area traditionally voted Democratic in local elections and sent Democrats to the U.S. House of Representatives and the state legislature. This was particularly the case in the decades of the 20th century when most African Americans were disenfranchised by the state constitution until the federal Voting Rights Act passed.

In 1994 incumbent representative Earl Hutto declined to run for reelection. That year, Republican Joe Scarborough was elected to the House of Representatives.

Voters of the county have not supported a Democratic presidential candidate since John F. Kennedy in 1960. In 1964, a majority of the county's voters supported Republican nominee Barry Goldwater. In 1968, third-party candidate George Wallace won Escambia County with 54% of the vote. In 1972, Republican Richard Nixon received 80% of the vote. Since 1972, Republican nominees in every presidential election have won an absolute majority in Escambia County, but in recent years, the Democratic Party has increased its share of the presidential vote. In 2020, Joe Biden was the first Democratic presidential nominee to win over 40% of the county's vote since Jimmy Carter in 1976. Growth in the Pensacola suburbs as well as the sizable black population has made Escambia County the least Republican-leaning of the Western Panhandle counties.

Government
Escambia County government is led by a five-member Board of County Commissioners. Each is elected from a single-member district. The county commission appoints a professional county administrator as chief administrative officer of the county.

The chief law enforcement authority of Escambia County is the Escambia County Sheriff's Office, also an elective office. The sheriff of Escambia County is Chip Simmons, elected in 2020.

The fire protection arm of the Escambia County is the Escambia County Fire Rescue (Florida).

Board of County Commissioners
Escambia County is divided into five districts. One county commissioner is elected from each district to serve a four-year term. Commissioners are chosen in partisan elections by voters from the districts in which they live. The board appoints a county administrator to be chief administrative officer of the county, responsible to the commission for the orderly operations of matters within the board's jurisdiction. The current office holders are,

 Escambia County District 1: Jeff Bergosh (vice chair)
 Escambia County District 2: Doug Underhill
 Escambia County District 3: Lumon May
 Escambia County District 4: Robert Bender (chair)
 Escambia County District 5: Steven Barry
 Escambia County Administrator: Wes Moreno (interim)
 Escambia County Deputy Administrator: Chips Kirschenfeld 
 Escambia County Deputy Administrator: Vacant
 Escambia County Attorney: Alison P. Rogers

County jail

In 2011, the US Justice Department’s Civil Rights Division issued a letter detailing the results of its investigation into conditions at Escambia County Jail, which houses roughly 1,300 prisoners. The department found that, although Sheriff David Morgan had recently implemented a series of reforms, conditions at the jail still routinely violated prisoners' constitutional rights.

Specifically, the department concluded that known systemic deficiencies, stemming mainly from staffing shortages, subjected prisoners to excessive risk of assault by other prisoners and to inadequate mental health care. Additionally, the department found that, until recently, the jail had an informal policy and practice of segregating its housing units, reserving one for African-American prisoners. According to the Department of Justice, this race-based segregation stigmatized and discriminated against many of the prisoners, and aggravated racial tensions in the jail. Between April 2012 and March 2013, the prison recorded 176 inmate-on-inmate assaults, including 20 serious head wounds.

The investigation released a letter of findings:
 Prisoner-on-prisoner assaults are a common occurrence at the jail, making the Facility unsafe for prisoners. Assaults occur routinely primarily because of a shortage of correctional staff. The facility needs more staff to patrol jail pods, intervene when altercations or fights break out, and search cells for dangerous items that could be used as weapons against fellow prisoners;
 A staffing study released in March 2011 commissioned by county leadership has given Jail leadership good reason to know that staffing shortages pose a significant risk to prisoner safety. Among other findings, the study concluded that: the jail "is operating with only about three-fourths of its needed staff; that "the [j]ail has been understaffed for many years;" that "[d]eputies ... are routinely borrowed from other jobs which results in leaving their posts unmanned;" that "[t]he frequency of some important operations, such as cell searches, is reduced due to lack of staff to conduct the searches;" that "[p]osts are understaffed or not staffed at all;" and that, "[l]arge insufficiencies in jail staffing ... raise the likelihood that something serious could happen that would overwhelm the jail's ability to respond;"
 The Jail's leadership fails to appropriately monitor and track prisoner-on-prisoner violence and staff-on-prisoner uses of force;
 The jail's decades-long practice of housing some prisoners in housing units designated as only for black prisoners ("black-only pods") racially discriminates against African-Americans, contributes to prisoner perceptions that the jail favors white prisoners over black prisoners, and reduces safety by exacerbating racial tensions among prisoners at the Facility;
 Prisoners are not given timely and adequate access to appropriately skilled mental health care professionals;
 The jail routinely fails to provide appropriate medications to prisoners with mental illness;
 The jail provides inadequate housing and observation for prisoners with serious mental illness and/or at risk of self-injury, including suicide; and
 On average, the jail sends roughly one prisoner per month to the hospital after an incident of self-injury, a rate judged indicative of an inadequate mental health program.

The Department of Justice concluded from these facts that Escambia County Jail's practices violated the fourteenth amendment's due process protections for pre-trial detainees, as well as the eighth amendment's protections for those convicted of a criminal offense. Jail officials must refrain from showing deliberate indifference to conditions of confinement posing an excessive risk of harm to prisoners.

Roy L. Austin Jr., deputy assistant attorney general of the Civil Rights Division, commended Sheriff Morgan for his willingness to remedy problems identified during the course of the investigation. The department conducted this investigation under the Civil Rights of Institutionalized Persons Act (CRIPA) to enforce constitutional mandates. The department's investigation was broad-based.

The investigation was conducted by Special Litigation Counsel Avner Shapiro and Senior Trial Attorney David Deutsch of the Civil Rights Division's Special Litigation Section. The findings letter is available on the department's website.

Education

Public primary and secondary education schools in Pensacola are administered by the Escambia County School District, the county's only school district.

The University of West Florida, Pensacola State College, and Pensacola Christian College are in Escambia County.

Media

Newspapers
The largest daily print newspaper in the area is the Pensacola News Journal. There is also a weekly print newspaper, The Independent News. An online-only newspaper, NorthEscambia.com, serves the entire county while concentrating on its northern half.

Television
One major network broadcasts from Pensacola, ABC affiliate WEAR.  Several major networks are broadcast from nearby Mobile, such as CBS affiliate WKRG, NBC affiliate WPMI-TV, and Fox affiliate WALA. The following is a list of broadcast television stations in the Mobile, Alabama – Pensacola – Fort Walton Beach, Florida market. Cox Communications provides cable television service in the county's urbanized areas, and television advertising through its subsidiary, Cox Media. Spectrum holds the cable television franchise for the county's mainland rural areas, while Mediacom serves the Pensacola Beach community on Santa Rosa Island.

 WALA
 WAWD
 WFNA
 WBQP-CD
 WEAR-TV
 WEIQ
 WFBD
 WFGX
 WHBR
 WJTC
 WKRG-TV
 WMPV-TV
 WPAN
 WPMI-TV
 WRBD-LP
 WSRE

Radio
Radio stations in the Pensacola / Mobile market:

Transportation

Airports
 Coastal Airport
 Ferguson Airport
 Pensacola International Airport

Transit
Escambia County is served by buses run by Escambia County Area Transit.

Major highways

 
 
 
 
  US 98 
  BUS US 98
  State Road 4 
  State Road 97
  State Road 173
  State Road 289
  State Road 291
  State Road 292
  State Road 295
  State Road 296

Railroads
Pensacola was a scheduled stop on the route of Amtrak's Los Angeles-Orlando Sunset Limited from 1993 to 2005, when damage to railroad bridges and tracks caused by Hurricane Katrina resulted in cancellation of the route east of New Orleans.  Escambia County has had no passenger train service since then.

Before the creation of Amtrak in 1971, Pensacola was served by the New Orleans-Jacksonville Gulf Wind, operated jointly by the Louisville and Nashville Railroad and the Seaboard Air Line Railroad.

The following freight railroads serve Escambia County:
 CSX from Flomaton, Alabama, to Pensacola
 Florida Gulf & Atlantic Railroad, which acquired most of the CSX main line from Pensacola to Jacksonville on June 1, 2019
 Alabama & Gulf Coast Railway from Amory, Mississippi, to Pensacola

Library
Escambia County is served by the West Florida Regional Library System.

Communities

City
 Pensacola

Town
 Century

Census-designated places

 Bellview
 Brent
 Ensley
 Ferry Pass
 Gonzalez
 Goulding
 Molino
 Myrtle Grove
 Warrington
 West Pensacola

Other unincorporated communities

 Barrineau Park
 Barth
 Beulah
 Bluff Springs
 Bogia
 Bratt
 Brownsville
 Cantonment
 Innerarity Point
 McDavid
 Millview
 Oak Grove
 Pensacola Beach
 Perdido Key
 Pleasant Grove
 Walnut Hill

Ghost towns
 Muscogee
 Pine Barren

See also
 National Register of Historic Places listings in Escambia County, Florida
 Florida Panhandle

Notes

References

Further reading
 Butler, J. Michael. Beyond Integration: The Black Freedom Struggle in Escambia County, Florida, 1960 -1980 (University of North Carolina Press, 2016). xx, 326 pp.

Sources incorporated into this article

External links

 Escambia County
 Escambia County School District
 Historic issues of the Pensacola Journal (1905-1904) at Florida and Puerto Rico Digital Newspaper Project

 
Pensacola metropolitan area
Florida placenames of Native American origin
World War II Heritage Cities
1821 establishments in Florida Territory
Populated places established in 1821
Florida counties
North Florida